Adam Andrzej Ostrowski (born 15 May 1980 in Łódź, Poland), better known as O.S.T.R., is a Polish rapper, musician, audio engineer and record producer, famous for his freestyle rap skills, ambitious lyrics and unique beats. He graduated from the Academy of Music in Łódź, violin class. He is one of the few Polish rappers who have received professional musical education. 
He has collaborated with American rappers such as Evidence, El Da Sensei, Craig G, Keith Murray, Jeru The Damaja, Lil' Dap, Sadat X and Canadian producer Marco Polo.
He has also collaborated with many Polish artists, including jazz musicians Michał Urbaniak, Hades, SOFA, Fokus, DJ Deszczu Strugi, DonGURALesko, Vienio i Pelson, Fu, Pezet, Sistars and Slums Attack. He is a member of bands such as Tabasko, Skill Mega, Killing Skills, Beat Brothers and musical project POE. He is also a former member of Obóz TA and LWC. In 2013, he shared the position of art director of Męskie Granie festival with alternative rock vocalist Kasia Nosowska.

Discography

Studio albums

Collaborative albums

Live albums

Music videos

Movies 
 Z odzysku (2006, as himself)
 Ziomek (2006, voice)

References

External links 
 Official web site

Polish rappers
Polish violinists
Male violinists
Polish keyboardists
Polish record producers
1980 births
Living people
Audio production engineers
21st-century violinists
21st-century male musicians